The men's 800 metre swimming competition at the 2015 Summer Universiade in Gwangju was held on 4–5 July at the Nambu University International Aquatics Center.

Schedule
All times are Korea Standard Time (UTC+09:00)

Results

Heats

Final

References

2015 Summer Universiade events